Cop and a Half is a 1993 American family buddy cop-comedy film directed by Henry Winkler, and stars Burt Reynolds, Norman D. Golden II, and Ray Sharkey in his final role.  Reynolds plays a veteran cop who reluctantly takes an eight-year-old boy (Golden) as his partner to solve a murder investigation.

Cop and a Half opened at #1 in the US and grossed $40.7 million worldwide against a $14 million budget. The film was followed by a lower budgeted, direct-to-DVD sequel, Cop and a Half: New Recruit (2017).

Plot

Devon Butler (Norman D. Golden II) is an eight-year-old boy who lives in Tampa with his grandmother and dreams of being a cop. He watches police TV shows, knows police procedures and plays cops and robbers with his friend Ray (Sammy Hernandez). One day, while snooping around in a warehouse, he witnesses a murder. He goes to the police, who want the information but he refuses to give it unless they make him a cop. They place him in the care of veteran Detective Nick McKenna (Burt Reynolds), who dislikes children and the two team up in a comic series of events to find the killer and take down a drug kingpin who ordered the hit.

Cast
 Burt Reynolds as Detective Nick McKenna
 Norman D. Golden II as Devon Butler
 Ruby Dee as Rachel Baldwin
 Holland Taylor as Captain Rubio
 Ray Sharkey as Vinnie Fountain
 Sammy Hernandez as Ray Sanchez
 Sean O'Neal as McNally
 Frank Sivero as "Chu"
 Rocky Giordani as Quintero
 Marc Macaulay as Waldo
 Tom McCleister as Rudy
 Ralph Wilcox as Detective Matt McPhail
 Tom Kouchalakos as Detective Jenkins

Production
Macaulay Culkin was approached to play the child. Culkin dropped out, along with Kurt Russell, who was attached to play Det. McKenna, when the film was delayed for script rewrites.  The child co-star was rewritten to be female, then back to male once Golden was cast.  Shooting took place in Tampa, Florida between April and June 1992.

Reynolds reportedly argued with director Winkler through the shoot and later became convinced that producer Brian Grazer refused to work with him again as a result.

The film's original score was composed by Alan Silvestri.

Soundtrack
Joey Lawrence's "Nothin' My Love Can't Fix" is used as the end title song.

Reception
The film holds a 13% approval rating on the film review aggregator site Rotten Tomatoes, based on 15 reviews, with an average rating of 3.3/10. Audiences surveyed by CinemaScore gave the film a grade of "B+" on scale of A+ to F. Jay Boyar of the Orlando Sentinel wrote, "Just about the only really enjoyable thing about Cop and a Half is Norman D. Golden II, who is genuinely cute and a pretty good little actor besides." Film critic and historian Leonard Maltin seemed to agree: "A hemorrhoid-and-a-half to anyone who sits all the way through this...abjectly painful comedy, which does about as much for Reynolds' career as Stop! Or My Mom Will Shoot did for Sylvester Stallone's." Critic Gene Siskel also excoriated the film, seeing it as indicative of "artistic bankruptcy" on Burt Reynolds' part, and singled out Norman D. Golden II's performance as "awkward". Siskel later called it the worst movie of 1993. Siskel speculated that NBC thought little of the film when they aired it in its broadcast-network debut, pointing out that they scheduled it opposite the 1997 Super Bowl. However, Roger Ebert gave it 3 stars out of a possible 4, saying, "There isn't much that's original in Cop and a Half, but there's a lot that's entertaining, and there's a winning performance by a young man with a big name, Norman D. Golden II, who plays little Devon Butler, a kid who dreams of someday wearing the shield."

Box office
The film debuted at No.1. In its second week it dropped to number 3.  Industry analysists expected it to open with $4 million, but it grossed $6 million.  Variety attributed the film's opening to its poster, which they said is reminiscent of Kindergarten Cop.  It grossed a total of $31.9 million in the US and another $8.8 in other territories for worldwide total of $40.7 million, making the film a considerable success against its modest $14 million budget.

Awards

Sequel
A straight-to-DVD sequel, entitled Cop and a Half: New Recruit, was released on August 10, 2017, starring Lou Diamond Phillips and Lulu Wilson.

References

External links

 

1993 films
American police detective films
1990s crime comedy films
American buddy cop films
American crime comedy films
1990s English-language films
Films scored by Alan Silvestri
Films directed by Henry Winkler
Films set in Tampa, Florida
Films set in Florida
Films shot in Florida
Imagine Entertainment films
1990s police comedy films
Universal Pictures films
1990s buddy cop films
1993 comedy films
Golden Raspberry Award winning films
Films produced by Paul Maslansky
1990s American films